The 2015 AFL Tasmania TSL premiership season was an Australian rules football competition staged across Tasmania, Australia over eighteen home and away rounds and six finals series matches between 3 April and 19 September.

North Launceston were the premiers for the 2015 season, after they defeated Glenorchy by 12 points in the Grand Final.

Participating Clubs
Burnie Dockers Football Club
Clarence District Football Club
Devonport Football Club
Glenorchy District Football Club
Hobart City Football Club
Kingborough Tigers Football Club
Lauderdale Football Club
Launceston Football Club
North Launceston Football Club
Western Storm Football Club

Awards
Source: See here
 Alastair Lynch Medal (Best afield throughout season): Jaye Bowden (Glenorchy)
 Eade Medal (Best and Fairest in Development League): Brendan Hay (Clarence)
 Hudson Medal (Highest goal kicker in TSL season): Jaye Bowden (Glenorchy) – 57 goals
 Baldock Medal (Grand Final Best on Ground): Josh Holland (North Launceston)
 Cazaly Medal (Premiership Coach in TSL): Zane Littlejohn (North Launceston)
 Matthew Richardson Medal (Rookie of the Year): Jordon Arnold (Glenorchy)
 RACT Insurance Player Of The Year: Taylor Whitford (North Launceston)

2015 TSL Club Coaches
Clint Proctor (Burnie)
Matthew Drury (Clarence)
Mitch Thorp (Devonport)
Aaron Cornelius (Glenorchy)
Michael McGregor (Hobart City)
Darren Winter (Lauderdale)
Scott Stephens (Launceston)
Zane Littlejohn (North Launceston)
Mitch Hills (Western Storm)
Adam Henley (Kingborough)

2015 Leading Goalkickers
Jaye Bowden (Glenorchy) - 61
Daniel Muir (Glenorchy) - 58
Ben Halton (Lauderdale) - 55
Julian Dobosz (Hobart City) - 51
Chris McDonald (Burnie) - 48

Highest Individual Goalkickers (Match)
 8 – Daniel Muir (Glenorchy) v Launceston – 2 May 2015 at KGV Oval
 8 – Julian Dobosz (Hobart City) v Devonport – 25 April 2015 at Devonport Oval
 8 – Sonny Whiting (Launceston) v Lauderdale – 23 May 2015 at Windsor Park
 7 – Aaron McNab (Devonport) v North Launceston – 4 July 2015 at Devonport Oval

Premiership season
Source: TSL Season 2015 results and fixtures

Round 1

Round 2 (10 & 11 April)
 Launceston 12.14. (86) v Western Storm 12.11. (83) - Aurora Stadium
 Lauderdale 12.8. (80) v Clarence 9.7. (61) - Blundstone Arena
 Devonport 17.16. (118) v Kingborough 6.15. (51) - Devonport Oval
 Glenorchy 14.13. (97) v Hobart City 12.10. (82) - Queenborough Oval
 North Launceston 20.11. (131) v Burnie 12.10. (82) - Aurora Stadium

Round 3 (17 & 18 April)
 Clarence 9.19. (73) v Hobart City 7.9. (51) - Blundstone Arena
 Lauderdale 7.14. (56) v North Launceston 7.13. (55) - Lauderdale Oval
 Devonport 14.10. (94) v Launceston 8.10. (58) - Windsor Park
 Glenorchy 10.16. (76) v Kingborough 4.1. (25) - Twin Ovals Complex
 Burnie 18.9. (117) v Western Storm 13.10. (88) - West Park

Round 4 (25 & 26 April)
 Devonport 16.10. (106) v Hobart 13.5. (83) - Devonport Oval 
 Glenorchy 15.9. (99) v Lauderdale 9.11. (65) - KGV Oval
 Kingborough 15.10. (100) v Clarence 13.5. (83) - Twin Ovals Complex *
 North Launceston 14.11. (95) v Western Storm 12.8. (80) - Aurora Stadium
 Burnie 18.11. (119) v Launceston 10.10. (70) - Windsor Park
Note: Kingborough's first win in the TSL.

Round 5 (2 May)
 Burnie 11.20. (86) v Clarence 4.7. (31) - West Park
 Glenorchy 23.15. (153) v Launceston 6.3. (39) - KGV Oval
 Hobart City 12.12. (84) v Western Storm 8.16. (64) - North Hobart Oval
 Lauderdale 19.7. (121) v Kingborough 4.11. (35) - Lauderdale Oval
 North Launceston 14.21. (105) v Devonport 9.9. (63) - Aurora Stadium

Round 6 (15 & 16 May)
 North Launceston 24.16. (160) v Launceston 6.5. (41) - Aurora Stadium
 Glenorchy 17.14. (116) v Clarence 8.11. (59) - Blundstone Arena
 Lauderdale 17.10. (112) v Hobart City 8.16. (64) - Lauderdale Oval
 Burnie 18.17. (125) v Kingborough 7.8. (50) - Twin Ovals Complex
 Devonport 11.14. (80) v Western Storm 11.8. (74) - Devonport Oval

Round 7 (22 & 23 May)
 Hobart City 12.12. (84) v Kingborough 11.13. (79) - North Hobart Oval
 Glenorchy 19.5. (119) v Devonport 5.6. (36) - KGV Oval
 Launceston 15.11. (101) v Lauderdale 15.9. (99) - Windsor Park
 Clarence 10.14. (74) v Western Storm 7.18. (60) - Aurora Stadium
 Burnie 12.9. (81) v North Launceston 8.4. (52) - West Park

Round 8 (30 & 31 May)
 Burnie 6.16. (52) v Devonport 5.10. (40) - Devonport Oval
 Hobart City 11.5. (71) v North Launceston 10.10 (70) - North Hobart Oval
 Glenorchy 17.13. (115) v Kingborough 5.5. (35) - Twin Ovals Complex
 Clarence 15.15. (105) v Lauderdale 11.12. (78) - Lauderdale Oval
 Launceston 10.7. (67) v Western Storm 9.11. (65) - Windsor Park

Round 9 (13 June)
 Clarence 17.14. (116) v Kingborough 8.7. (55) - Blundstone Arena
 Glenorchy 16.14. (110) v Hobart City 3.7. (25) - KGV Oval
 Lauderdale 11.15. (81) v Devonport 10.16. (76) - lauderdale Oval
 North Launceston 16.15. (111) v Western Storm 11.4. (70) - Aurora Stadium
 Launceston 15.11. (101) v Burnie 11.14. (80) - West Park

Round 10 (20 & 21 June)
 Hobart City 18.11. (119) v Clarence 10.11. (71) - North Hobart Oval
 Lauderdale 14.9. (93) v Glenorchy 9.7. (61) - Lauderdale Oval
 North Launceston 18.11. (119) v Kingborough 8.10. (58) - Aurora Stadium
 Devonport 13.21. (99) v Launceston 6.14. (50) - Devonport Oval
 Burnie 24.13. (157) v Westerm Storm 7.7. (49) - Aurora Stadium

Round 11 (27 June)
 Burnie 13.15. (93) v Hobart City 4.11. (35) - West Park
 Western Storm 12.19. (91) v Devonport 8.4. (52) - Aurora Stadium
 North Launceston 16.9. (105) v Clarence 10.13. (73) - Blundstone Arena
 Glenorchy 13.17. (95) v Launceston 7.6. (48) - Windsor Park
 Kingborough 11.12. (78) v Lauderdale 9.16. (70) - Twin Ovals Complex

Round 12 (4 & 5 July)
 Devonport 16.10. (106) v North Launceston 9.8. (62) - Devonport Oval
 Hobart City 14.14. (98) v Western Storm 10.6. (66) - North Hobart Oval
 Burnie 14.11. (95) v Lauderdale 8.10. (58) - Lauderdale Oval
 Kingborough 11.13. (79) v Launceston 11.7. (73) - Twin Ovals Complex
 Glenorchy 15.12. (102) v Clarence 7.7. (49) - KGV Oval

Round 13A (11 July)
 Burnie 16.21. (117) v Kingborough 4.9. (33) - West Park
 Clarence 20.10. (130) v Devonport 16.7. (103) - Blundstone Arena

Round 13B (17 & 18 July)
 North Launceston 15.7. (97) v Launceston 8.5. (53) - Aurora Stadium
 Hobart City 13.9. (87) v Lauderdale 12.8. (80) - North Hobart Oval
 Glenorchy 15.12. (102) v Western Storm 10.9. (69) - Aurora Stadium

Round 14 (25 & 26 July)
 Glenorchy 18.15. (123) v Kingborough 7.6. (48) - KGV Oval 
 Lauderdale 14.15. (99) v Clarence 13.3. (81) - Blundstone Arena
 Hobart City 19.8. (122) v Launceston 7.4. (46) - Windsor Park
 North Launceston 17.3. (105) v Western Storm 5.4. (34) - Aurora Stadium
 Burnie 10.13. (73) v Devonport 3.4. (22) - Devonport Oval

Round 15 (1 August)
 Clarence 10.11. (71) v Hobart City 8.11. (59) - North Hobart Oval
 Glenorchy 11.14. (80) v Lauderdale 2.9. (21) - Lauderdale Oval
 Devonport 12.8. (80) v Launceston 9.7. (61) - Windsor Park
 Kingborough 9.15. (69) v Western Storm 7.5. (47) - Twin Ovals Complex
 North Launceston 8.13. (61) v Burnie 8.12. (60) - West Park

Round 16 (8 & 9 August)
 Launceston 11.5. (71) v Clarence 8.6. (54) - Blundstone Arena
 Devonport 15.13. (103) v Lauderdale 10.9. (69) - Devonport Oval
 North Launceston 8.14. (62) v Glenorchy 9.6. (60) - Aurora Stadium
 Hobart City 13.12. (90) v Kingborough 1.10. (16) - Twin Ovals Complex
 Burnie 10.10. (70) v Western Storm 7.4. (46) - Aurora Stadium

Round 17 (14–16 August)
 Glenorchy 17.17. (119) v Hobart City 1.10. (16) - KGV Oval
 North Launceston 17.14. (116) v Clarence 13.6. (84) - Aurora Stadium
 Burnie 15.14. (104) v Launceston 7.8. (50) - West Park
 Devonport 19.16. (130) v Western Storm 8.11. (59) - Aurora Stadium
 Lauderdale 20.18. (138) v Kingborough 8.7. (55) - Lauderdale Oval

Round 18 (21 & 22 August)
 Lauderdale 15.7. (97) v Hobart City 6.8. (44) - North Hobart Oval
 Glenorchy 19.13. (127) v Burnie 8.5. (53) - KGV Oval
 Clarence 16.13. (109) v Kingborough 11.10. (76) - Blundstone Arena
 Devonport 12.7. (79) v North Launceston 11.11. (77) - Devonport Oval
 Western Storm 16.14. (110) v Launceston 11.2. (68) - Windsor Park *
Note: Western Storm's final game in the TSL.

Ladder

Season Records

Highest Club Scores
 24.16. (160) – North Launceston v Launceston 15 May 2015 at Aurora Stadium
 24.13. (157) – Burnie v Western Storm 21 June 2015 at Aurora Stadium
 23.15. (153) – Glenorchy v Launceston 2 May 2015 at KGV Oval

Lowest Club Scores
 1.10. (16) – Hobart City v Glenorchy 17.17. (119) – 14 August 2015 at KGV Oval 
 1.10. (16) – Kingborough v Hobart City 13.12. (90) – 8 August 2015 at Twin Ovals Complex
 2.9. (21) – Lauderdale v Glenorchy 11.14. (80) – 1 August 2015 at Lauderdale Oval

TSL Team Of The Year

TSL Finals Series

Qualifying Final
(Saturday, 29 August 2015)
 Burnie: 5.5. (35) | 9.8. (62) | 12.10. (82) | 15.14. (104)
 North Launceston: 0.1. (1) | 3.2. (20) | 9.3. (57) | 13.10. (88)
at West Park

Elimination Final
(Saturday, 29 August 2015)
 Lauderdale: 3.2. (20) | 5.4. (34) | 9.6. (60)| 13.8. (86)
 Devonport: 0.0. (0) | 1.3. (9) | 5.7. (37)| 7.8. (50)
at Blundstone Arena

1st Semi Final
(Saturday, 5 September 2015)
 North Launceston: 3.3. (21) | 6.10. (46) | 8.13. (61) | 9.19. (73)
 Lauderdale: 1.3. (9) | 3.6. (24) | 6.7. (43) | 10.10. (70)
at Aurora Stadium

2nd Semi Final
(Saturday, 5 September 2015)
 Glenorchy: 5.2. (32) | 7.4. (46) | 11.9. (75) | 13.16. (94)
 Burnie: 3.0. (18) | 6.2. (38) | 7.2. (44) | 8.4. (52) 
at Blundstone Arena

Preliminary Final
(Saturday, 12 September 2015)
 North Launceston: 2.2. (14) | 5.6. (36) | 9.12. (66) | 13.18. (96)
 Burnie: 4.2. (26) | 5.3 (33) | 8.3. (51) | 12.3. (75)
at Aurora Stadium

Grand Final

State Game

References

External links
 Tasmanian State League Website
 AFL Tasmania

2015
2015 in Australian rules football